Kandace LaShawn Love (born October 24, 1984) is an American professional soccer defender who currently plays for California Storm in the Women's Premier Soccer League. She previously played for the FC Gold Pride and Western New York Flash of Women's Professional Soccer.

Early life
Wilson was born in Los Angeles, California.

Cal State Fullerton
Wilson attended Cal State Fullerton and was a three-time
All-Big West Conference First Team selection. In 2005, she was named the Big West Co-Offensive Player of the Year following her senior season.

Playing career

Club
Wilson was drafted with the 13th overall selection in the 2008 WPS General Draft by FC Gold Pride.  She assumed a starting role with the club, but suffered a season-ending hip injury on May 24, 2009, against the Los Angeles Sol.  Late in the game while guarding Marta, Wilson "was aggressively pushed off the ball and fell to the ground suffering a sublimation (partial separation) of her left hip and fracturing the left posterior aspect of the acetabulum (hip socket)."

In 2011, she played for the Western New York Flash, the team's inaugural season in the Women's Professional Soccer league. The team won the league championship.

In February 2013 she joined Sky Blue FC in the new National Women's Soccer League

Coaching career
Wilson is an assistant coach at Cal State Fullerton.

References

External links
 FC Gold Pride player profile
 Pali Blues player profile

FC Gold Pride players
Western New York Flash players
Cal State Fullerton Titans women's soccer coaches
Cal State Fullerton Titans women's soccer players
1984 births
Living people
Pali Blues players
African-American women's soccer players
USL W-League (1995–2015) players
NJ/NY Gotham FC players
Women's Professional Soccer players
American women's soccer players
Women's association football defenders
Ajax America Women players
American soccer coaches
21st-century African-American sportspeople
21st-century African-American women
20th-century African-American people
20th-century African-American women